Durgapur Steel Thermal Power Station is a coal-based thermal power plant located Durgapur city in Paschim Bardhaman district in the Indian state of West Bengal. The power plant is operated by the Damodar Valley Corporation.

Capacity
It has an installed capacity of 1,000 megawatts.

References

Coal-fired power stations in West Bengal
Buildings and structures in Durgapur, West Bengal
Energy infrastructure completed in 2012
2012 establishments in West Bengal